Thyroid peroxidase, also called thyroperoxidase (TPO) or iodide peroxidase, is an enzyme expressed mainly in the thyroid where it is secreted into colloid. Thyroid peroxidase oxidizes iodide ions to form iodine atoms for addition onto tyrosine residues on thyroglobulin for the production of thyroxine (T4) or triiodothyronine (T3), the thyroid hormones. In humans, thyroperoxidase is encoded by the TPO gene.

Catalyzed reaction 

 + I− + H+ + H2O2 ⇒  + 2 H2O

Iodide is oxidized to iodine radical which immediately reacts with tyrosine.

 + I− + H+ + H2O2 ⇒  + 2 H2O

The second iodine atom is added in similar manner to the reaction intermediate 3-iodotyrosine.

Function 

Inorganic iodine enters the body primarily as iodide, I−. After entering the thyroid follicle (or thyroid follicular cell) via a Na+/I− symporter (NIS) on the basolateral side, iodide is shuttled across the apical membrane into the colloid via pendrin, after which thyroid peroxidase oxidizes iodide to atomic iodine (I) or iodinium (I+). The "organification of iodine," the incorporation of iodine into thyroglobulin for the production of thyroid hormone, is nonspecific; that is, there is no TPO-bound intermediate, but iodination occurs via reactive iodine species released from TPO. The chemical reactions catalyzed by thyroid peroxidase occur on the outer apical membrane surface and are mediated by hydrogen peroxide.

Stimulation and inhibition

TPO is stimulated by TSH, which upregulates gene expression.

TPO is inhibited by the thioamide drugs, such as propylthiouracil and methimazole.  In laboratory rats with insufficient iodine intake, genistein has demonstrated inhibition of TPO.

Clinical significance
Thyroid peroxidase is a frequent epitope of autoantibodies in autoimmune thyroid disease, with such antibodies being called anti-thyroid peroxidase antibodies (anti-TPO antibodies). This is most commonly associated with Hashimoto's thyroiditis. Thus, an antibody titer can be used to assess disease activity in patients that have developed such antibodies.

Diagnostic use 

In diagnostic immunohistochemistry, the expression of thyroid peroxidase (TPO) is lost in papillary thyroid carcinoma.

References

External links 
 

EC 1.11.1
Thyroid